Marc Ruchmann (born 27 January 1981 in Les Lilas, Seine-Saint-Denis) is a French actor, director and musician.

Biography
Ruchmann is of Alsatian Jewish and Pied-Noir-Italian descent. Ruchmann trained at the Conservatoire de Paris between 1998 and 2000. He continued with classes at Théâtre national de Chaillot. He was given his first feature film role in François Ozon's 5x2. In 2009 he appeared in the Arte French-Israeli mini-series, Revivre about the founding of the State of Israel following the Holocaust. In the same year he appeared alongside the late Ronit Elkabetz in Fanny Ardant's directorial debut, Ashes and Blood.

He also acted alongside Hollywood actresses Angelina Jolie and Sharon Stone in The Tourist (2010) and Largo Winch II (2011) respectively. In 2015 he directed the short film, Who Am I After Your Exile in Me? about a love affair between an Israeli Jewish woman and a Palestinian Arab Muslim man. In 2016 he appeared in Tout, tout de suite as the hate-crime victim, Ilan Halimi. Halimi's murder was described by Haaretz as "the most brutal attack on a European Jew since WW2." In 2017 he appeared in the Netflix series, The Chalet and is currently appearing in a new Netflix project, The Hook Up Plan where he plays a male escort.

As a singer he performs under the pseudonym Markus. He has also appeared as an actor in music videos for other artists. Appearing in "Orders and Degrees" by Peter von Poehl and "Club 27" by Les Fils du Calvaire.

Filmography

References

External links

 

1981 births
Living people
Male actors from Paris
French male film actors
French male television actors
French people of Italian descent
French people of Jewish descent
French people of Algerian descent
Pieds-Noirs
20th-century French male actors
21st-century French male actors